Australian territory means one or both of two different things. 

 A specific Territory of Australia (as distinct from the six States of Australia), especially in the capitalised form (i.e. Territory rather than territory).
 Any area of land or sea under the sovereign control of the Australian government, including the:
 Australian mainland,
 Australian external territories, or
 Exclusive economic zone of Australia.